Abrdn Private Equity Opportunities Trust, formerly Standard Life Private Equity Trust (SLPE), is a large British investment company dedicated to investments in private equity funds and direct investments into private companies with European focus. Established in 2001, the company is a constituent of the FTSE 250 Index, an index of the larger companies on the London Stock Exchange.

The chairperson is Christina McComb. It is managed by abrdn. The company changed its name from Standard Life Private Equity Trust to Abrdn Private Equity Opportunities Trust in April 2022.

References

External links
 Official site

Investment trusts of the United Kingdom